The cuisine of Eswatini is largely determined by the seasons and the geographical region. Staple foods in Eswatini include sorghum and maize, often served with goat meat, a very popular livestock there. The farming industry mainly depends on sugar cane, tobacco, rice, corn, peanuts, and the exportation of goat meat and beef. Many Swazis are subsistence farmers who supplement their diet with food bought from markets. 

Produce and imports from coastal nations are also part of the cuisine of Eswatini . Some local markets have food stalls with traditional Swazi meat stew, sandwiches, maize meal and seasonal roasted corn on the cob.

Traditional foods

Traditional foods of Eswatini include:
 Sishwala—thick porridge normally served with meat or vegetables
 Incwancwa—sour porridge made of fermented cornmeal
 Sitfubi—fresh milk cooked and mixed with cornmeal
 Siphuphe setindlubu—thick porridge made of mashed ground nuts
 Emasi etinkhobe temmbila—ground corn mixed with sour milk
 Emasi emabele—ground sorghum mixed with sour milk
 Sidvudvu—porridge made of pumpkin mixed with cornmeal
 Umncweba—dried uncooked meat (biltong)
 Siphuphe semabhontjisi—thick porridge made of mashed beans
 Tinkhobe—boiled whole maize
 Umbidvo wetintsanga—cooked pumpkin tops (leaves) mixed with ground nuts
 Emahewu—meal drink made from fermented thin porridge 
 Umcombotsi—traditional brewed beer in Siswati is called tjwala

See also

African cuisine
Umtsimba - marriage ceremony

References

Eswatini